The Heart of Wales line is a railway line running from Craven Arms in Shropshire to Llanelli in southwest Wales. It serves a number of rural centres, including the nineteenth-century spa towns Llandrindod Wells, Llangammarch Wells and Llanwrtyd Wells. At Builth Road, two miles (3.3 km) from the town of Builth Wells, the line crosses the former route of the earlier Mid Wales Railway, which closed in the 1960s.

History

Historically, the line was known as the Central Wales line and also included routes through Gowerton, where the railway crossed the West Wales lines and ran through Dunvant and Killay then down through the Clyne Valley to Blackpill, and then along the sea wall to Swansea Bay station, (near the former slip bridge) before finally reaching Swansea Victoria railway station. This section, originally built by the Llanelly Railway and Dock Company to compete with the Great Western Railway and break the monopoly they held on Swansea Dock, closed in 1964. Nationalisation of the railways had removed the need for competing routes, and the running down and closure of Swansea North Dock ended the need for freight services on this section. Trains now use the original LR main line to reach the West Wales lines at Llandeilo Junction and thence  and (after a reversal) .

The 1963 Beeching Report proposed the entire Central Wales line be closed but this was refused by the MoT except for the Pontarddulais to Swansea Victoria section. As a rural branch line, it survived the Beeching Axe since it carried freight traffic, serving the steelworks at Bynea and industrial areas such as Ammanford and Pontarddulais, linking them with the docks at Llanelli. It also passed through six marginal constituencies. During engineering work, the line is still occasionally used as a diversionary freight route. The basic service over the line since the seventies has remained more or less constant, with four or five trains per day in each direction on weekdays and two or three on Sundays (although the latter ran in summer only until quite recently).

The line is single track throughout (except for a few miles at the southern end shared with the Swansea District line) and has been operated under a Light Railway Order since 1972. Unless "Out of Course" working occurs the Llanwrtyd passing loop is used on two of the Monday – Saturday services and the Llandrindod passing loop is in use on the other two and also on the Sunday services. The signalling was modernised in 1986, when a system known as No Signalman Token Remote working was introduced.

For more than two years only two of the loops (Llandrindod and Llanwrtyd) were operational as Network Rail were unable to source spare parts for the points mechanisms used at all five: the design used is now obsolete. Parts had to be taken from the three decommissioned loops to keep the other two operational.  In 2009 NR stated their intention to install new conventional electric point machines at all five loops and restore the three out-of-service ones to full working order (after being heavily criticised by the chairman of the South Wales branch of Railfuture at the organisation's recent Annual General Meeting) but were unable to give a timescale for this to be carried out as design work on the new equipment was still ongoing. NR began the replacement works for the points after first installing the system on the line to Pembroke Dock, at the Tenby loop, on 7 December 2009 and then making minor alterations in Feb 2010.  was the first on the line to be modernised, the rest followed. The £5 million project was completed in October 2010.

In 2014 Network Rail added exit indicators at the trailing end of each loop to aid in the reversing of services: a decision taken so that all moves have an active indication of the status of the motor points.

In 1987 tragedy struck the line near Llandeilo when the Glanrhyd Bridge collapsed following heavy flooding, and an early morning northbound train plunged into the swollen River Towy, killing four people. For a while the future of the line was in doubt (the equally rural Carmarthen – Aberystwyth line had been closed in 1965 following serious flood damage as the cost of repairs was deemed unacceptable) but political forces of all sides rallied to ensure the line's survival.

Route
After leaving the West Wales Line at Llandeilo Junction (east of ), the route is shared with the Swansea District line as far as Morlais Junction (the site of a serious oil train derailment in the summer of 2020) before passing beneath the M4 Motorway & turning northwards towards  and Pantyfynnon. The short tunnel before the former station is the oldest surviving example still in use in Wales (dating from 1839), whilst the freight-only branch along the Amman valley to Gwaun-Cae-Gurwen diverges at the latter. North of Llandovery the character of the route changes, as it ascends into the Carmarthenshire hills towards the first of the line's two major summits at Sugar Loaf (820 feet (250 m) above sea level) on gradients as steep as 1 in 60. En route, it passes over the 283-yard (259 m) long Cynghordy viaduct across the Afon Bran valley before crossing the county boundary into Powys through the 1001-yd (915 m) summit tunnel beneath the Black Mountain range. A descent at 1 in 70-80 follows to Llanwrtyd Wells along the valley of the River Irfon, from where it continues via Builth Road to Llandrindod Wells - the largest settlement on the line.

It then heads to Knighton, where the station is in England but the town it serves is in Wales.

Services today

Passenger services
For many years there were four trains per day in each direction on weekdays and two on Sundays. From May 2015 an additional Monday to Friday train pair in each direction was introduced north of Llandrindod and south of Llandovery, ostensibly to improve commuting possibilities, although the consequential changes to existing services substantially lengthened the working day for those travelling to Shrewsbury. Trains are one or two carriages each, with a small team of staff. A buffet trolley service runs occasionally. Most stations are request stops.
From December 2022 a fifth train through train each way has been introduced as well as a later Shrewsbury-Llandrindod round trip and a late Swansea - Llandovery out and return service on weekdays only.

At Craven Arms, the line joins the Welsh Marches line to Church Stretton and Shrewsbury.

Passenger services are operated by Transport for Wales Rail using Class 150 or Class 153 diesel multiple units, although Class 175s have been used on rare occasions. The continued use of Class 153 DMUs has received criticism, notably from Kirsty Williams AM, who says:

The line has also been used for exceptional train movements, including:
 Charter trains taking in the scenic beauty of the route, such as The Welshman's charter on Saturday 30 April 2011

Freight services
Although no regular scheduled freight services use this line, the route is maintained to W5 standard to accommodate the occasional EWS diversions for Margam and Llanwern traffic when the south Wales route is closed.

Community rail
This is designated as a community rail partnership.

See also

 Railways of Shropshire
 History of Wales
 Royal Welsh Show
 Heart of Wales Line Trail

Notes

References

External links

Heart of Wales Line website
Heart of Wales Line Travellers Association website
Arriva Trains Wales: Heart of Wales Line timetable
Glanrhyd Rail Disaster BBC Report
Scenic Rail Britain: Heart of Wales Line page
Video footage of Llandrindod station

 
Railway lines in Wales
Railway lines in the West Midlands (region)
Rail transport in Carmarthenshire
Rail transport in Powys
Rail transport in Shropshire
Rail transport in Swansea
Community railway lines in Wales